GSK-4112 is an experimental drug that was developed by GlaxoSmithKline as an agonist of Rev-ErbAα. It is used for studying regulation of the circadian rhythm and its influence on diverse processes such as adipogenesis, regulation of bone density, and inflammation.

See also 
 SR8278
 SR9009
 SR9011

References 

Thiophenes
Tert-butyl compounds
Nitro compounds
Chlorobenzenes
Amines
Esters